Fernando Canesin Matos (born 27 February 1992) is a Brazilian footballer who plays for Cruzeiro as an attacking midfielder.

Career statistics

Honours
R.S.C. Anderlecht
 Belgian First Division: 2011–12
 Belgian Supercup: 2012

Athletico Paranaense
Campeonato Paranaense: 2020

References

External links

1992 births
Living people
People from Ribeirão Preto
Brazilian footballers
Association football midfielders
Belgian Pro League players
R.S.C. Anderlecht players
K.V. Oostende players
Campeonato Brasileiro Série A players
Campeonato Brasileiro Série B players
Club Athletico Paranaense players
Cruzeiro Esporte Clube players
Brazilian expatriate footballers
Brazilian expatriate sportspeople in Belgium
Expatriate footballers in Belgium
Footballers from São Paulo (state)